

Gary Wright (Born December 19, 1958) is a current American Sprint Car Series and former NASCAR and ARCA Racing Series driver. He is the all-time winningest driver in ASCS history, with 124 wins. He was inducted into the National Sprint Car Hall of Fame in 2011.

Motorsports career results

NASCAR
(key) (Bold – Pole position awarded by qualifying time. Italics – Pole position earned by points standings or practice time. * – Most laps led.)

Winston Cup Series

ASCS

As of 2008, Gary Wright is the winningest driver in American Sprint Car Series history with 124 wins. Wright also recorded 4 straight series championships from 2003–2007.

References

Living people
1958 births
People from Hooks, Texas
Racing drivers from Texas
NASCAR drivers
World of Outlaws drivers